Suchá Hora transmitter is a facility for FM- and TV-transmission on 1,231.6 metres high mountain Skalka (Kremnica Mountains) near Banská Bystrica in Slovakia. Suchá Hora transmitter uses as antenna mast a 312 metres tall guyed tubular mast, which is one of the tallest structure of Slovakia and one of the highest elevated supertall structures in Europe.
The mast of Suchá Hora transmitter was built in 1960. The transmitter went on service on October 28, 1960. In 1961 a storm blasted the roof of the transmitter building away and in 1962 the 7 ton weighing TV broadcasting antenna, which was covered with ice, fell from 300 metres height to the ground and impacted close to the transmitter building.   
Close to the tower, there is a small free-standing telecommunication tower built of steel.

FM

TV

See also 
 Dubnik Transmitter

External links 
 http://cestovani.idnes.cz/igsvet.asp?r=igsvet&c=A051005_081349_igsvet_tom
 http://www.solideurope.sk/TV_stanice.htm 
 http://www.radia.sk/vysielace/5_banska-bystrica-sucha-hora.html

Towers in Slovakia
Radio masts and towers in Europe
Transmitter sites in Slovakia
Towers completed in 1960
1960 establishments in Czechoslovakia